Jennifer Leigh Warren is an American stage, television, film, and voice-over actress/singer who first came to the world's attention for her work in professional musical theater. She is best known for originating the role of Crystal in the Howard Ashman /Alan Menken hit musical Little Shop of Horrors, for her performance in the original Broadway cast of the Michael John LaChiusa musical Marie Christine and for her show stopping performance in the role of Alice's Daughter in the original Broadway musical "Big River" with the song "How Blest We Are" written especially for her by Roger Miller.

She is a NAACP Theatre Award nominee, Los Angeles Times Ovation Award winner (and three-time nominee), Backstage Garland award winner, and won two Broadway World awards in the same season for her portrayal of the fairy godmother in the first US pantomime production A Cinderella Christmas directed by Bonnie Lythgoe and for her one-woman concert event Diamonds Are Forever:The Songs of Dame Shirley Bassey, that premiered in Los Angeles at the Renberg Theater, directed by Richard Jay-Alexander.

Filmography

Film 
 Valentine's Day  (2010)
 Firehouse Dog (2007)
 The Other Sister (1999)
 Matter of Trust (1998)
 Scooby-Doo on Zombie Island (1998) Video
 Sour Grapes (1998)
 Grace of My Heart (1996)
 The Crossing Guard (1995)
 What's Love Got to Do with It (1993)
 Forever, Lulu (1987)

Television 
 Rent: Live (2019) TV Movie
 A Night with Janis Joplin (2019) TV Movie
 Pretty Little Liars (2013-2014)
 Faux Baby (2008)
 Lipstick Jungle (2008)
 Dirt (2008) 
 Scrubs (2007)
 Jake in Progress (2005)
 Charlie Lawrence (2003)
 Touched by an Angel (2001)
 Sliders (1999 "Java Jive" episode - 5/8)
 ER (1996) 
 The Wayans Bros. (1996)
 The Wayans Bros. (1995)
 Homefront (1992)
 Santa Barbara (1992)
 God Bless the Child (1988) TV Movie
 The Gift of Amazing Grace (1986) TV Movie 
 Robert Klein on Broadway (1986)

Discography 
 The Stephen Schwartz Album, 1999 Varese Saraband.
 Big River: Original Cast Album, 1988 Verve.
 Little Shop of Horrors: Original Cast Album, 1982 Decca U.S. Label.

References

External links

External links 
Jennifer Leigh Warren official website

American actresses
Living people
Year of birth missing (living people)
21st-century American women